Bloomfield Collegiate School is a controlled grammar school for girls in Ballyhackamore in Belfast, Northern Ireland.

History 
Bloomfield was founded in 1905, one of a number of private school foundations of that era. It was originally proprietary (owned by the headmistress), co-educational, and accepted boarding students. It discontinued co-education in 1915.

House system 
Bloomfield has a house system consisting of four houses named after previous headmistresses: Clarke, Curran, Spencer and Walker. The houses are each represented by four colors: blue (Clarke), red (Curran), green (Spencer), and yellow (Walker).

Notable former pupils

Christine Bleakley, television presenter
Gemma Garrett, Miss Great Britain 2008
Thaddea Graham, actress
Naomi Long, prominent politician in Northern Ireland (leader of the Alliance Party, and elected to various positions)
Joan Lingard, novelist
Elaine Shemilt, artist and university professor

References

External links 
Bloomfield Collegiate website

Educational institutions established in 1905
Grammar schools in Belfast
Private schools in Northern Ireland
Secondary schools in Belfast

1905 establishments in Ireland